The Fulda is a river of Hesse and Lower Saxony, Germany. It is one of two headstreams of the Weser (the other one being the Werra).

The river arises at Wasserkuppe in the Rhön mountains in Hesse. From there it runs northeast, flanked by the Knüll mountains in the west and the Seulingswald in the east. Near Bebra it changes direction to the northwest.

After joining the Eder river it flows straight north until Kassel, then changes direction to the northeast, with the Kaufungen Forest east and the beginning of the Reinhardswald forest northwest.  The north end of the river meets the Werra in Hannoversch Münden, Lower Saxony, where the Fulda and the Werra join to form the Weser river.

Cities along the Fulda include:
 Gersfeld
 Fulda
 Bad Hersfeld
 Bebra
 Rotenburg an der Fulda
 Melsungen
 Kassel

See also
List of rivers of Hesse
List of rivers of Lower Saxony

References

External links

 Flight near Fulda Videoclip (10 MB, 1:20 min) from the German site http://www.osthessen-news.de

Rivers of Hesse
Rivers of Lower Saxony
Federal waterways in Germany
 
North Hesse
Rivers of Germany